WGNO (channel 26) is a television station in New Orleans, Louisiana, United States, affiliated with ABC. It is owned by Nexstar Media Group alongside CW owned-and-operated station WNOL-TV (channel 38). Both stations share studios at The Galleria in Metairie, while WGNO's transmitter is located in Chalmette, Louisiana.

History

As an independent station
The station first signed on the air at 5:00 p.m. on October 16, 1967, as WWOM-TV.  The call sign stood for "The Wonderful World of Movies," an adaptation of the "Wonderful World of Music" meaning used by co-owned radio station WWOM (600 AM, now WVOG; and 98.5 FM, now WYLD-FM). The station inaugurated programming with a greeting by then-Mayor Victor H. Schiro, which was followed by its first program, the 1927 Al Jolson film The Jazz Singer. Originally owned by David Wagenvoord, it was the first independent station in the state of Louisiana and the first commercial television station to sign on in New Orleans since WWL-TV (channel 4) debuted as the market's CBS affiliate on September 7, 1957.

The station—which broadcast for eight hours a day from late afternoon to midnight during its first years of operation—maintained a general entertainment programming format consisting mostly of older movies, some theatrical cartoon shorts and a few off-network syndicated programs. During its first decade on the air, the station also cherry-picked several programs from NBC, ABC and CBS that WDSU (channel 6), WVUE-TV (then on channel 12, now on channel 8) and WWL-TV chose not to broadcast. In 1969, the station experimented with a 24-hour daily schedule, claiming to be the first television station in the United States to broadcast on such a schedule; however, this format was short-lived.

The station was sold to Communications Corp. of the South, run by Seymour Smith, in 1971; after the purchase was finalized, the station changed its call letters to WGNO-TV on March 9, 1972. Around this time, the station began running more off-network syndicated sitcoms and westerns, along with a moderate amount of cartoons. The station expanded its programming schedule to about 12 hours each day by 1972, then began signing on at 10:00 a.m. in 1974; WGNO expanded its daily programming hours to about 19 hours a day by 1975. Throughout the 1970s, WGNO continued to program a general entertainment format with vintage sitcoms, older movies and religious programs.

WGNO began to be carried on many cable providers in southern Louisiana (including within the Baton Rouge market) during the 1970s, before it was replaced by Atlanta-based superstation WTCG. In 1981, WGNO also ran business news programming from the Financial News Network. From 1982 to 1987, WGNO aired a series of public service announcements featuring a character called "Tom Foote"; Tom was a local entertainer seen in area schools and in the French Quarter. For a time, the station produced an hour-long program called Tom Foote's Video Clubhouse, as well as News for Kids, produced by Foote.

In 1978, WGNO was purchased by General Media of Rockford, Illinois (doing business as Greater New Orleans Television, Inc.), who would in turn sell the station to Tribune Broadcasting in 1983. By coincidence, the station's callsign reflects a connection with Tribune's flagship television station in Chicago, WGN-TV (whose own call letters stand for "World's Greatest Newspaper", in reference to the longtime slogan of the company's founding newspaper, the Chicago Tribune); however, channel 26 had the "WGN" lettering in its callsign twelve years before Tribune even bought the station; this connection, coupled with the fact that two other Tribune-owned television stations also incorporated the "WGN" name in their callsigns (Denver's KWGN-TV and Atlanta's WGNX (now WANF), the former of which remains owned by the company), channel 26 kept the WGNO call letters. Under Tribune, the station continued to grow, and WGNO remained the leading independent station in the market even as other competitors signed on the air—WNOL-TV (channel 38) in March 1984 and later, WCCL (channel 49, now Ion Television owned-and-operated station WPXL-TV) in March 1989. WGNO reportedly turned down an offer by Fox to become a charter affiliate of the network, prior to its October 1986 launch; Fox programming instead went to WNOL, which its then-owners TVX Broadcast Group used as leverage to get Fox to sign a deal to affiliate with the majority of the company's independent stations. The station dropped the "-TV" suffix from the callsign on August 17, 1988.

As a WB affiliate
On November 2, 1993, the Warner Bros. Television division of Time Warner announced the formation of The WB Television Network, in which the Tribune Company held a minority ownership interest (initially 12.5%, before eventually expanding to 22%). As a result, Tribune affiliated the majority of its independent stations with the network as charter affiliates. This effectively ended WGNO's 28-year run as an independent station upon The WB's launch on January 11, 1995. At that time, The WB only offered a few hours of programming each week (airing only for two hours on Wednesday nights at the time of its launch, before adding a three-hour Sunday evening lineup, and a Monday-Saturday children's program block in September 1995); as a result, WGNO continued to run syndicated programming for the remainder of the broadcast day.

As an ABC affiliate
That same year, Burnham Broadcasting sold longtime ABC affiliate WVUE-TV (now owned by Gray Television) and three other stations to SF Broadcasting, a joint venture between Savoy Pictures and Fox, resulting in all four stations dropping their "Big Three" affiliations and joining Fox. On August 14, 1995, ABC signed a 10-year affiliation agreement with Tribune Broadcasting for WGNO to become its New Orleans affiliate. WVUE switched its affiliation to Fox on January 1, 1996 (as SF Broadcasting's only ABC affiliate to join that network; KHON-TV in Honolulu, WALA-TV in Mobile and WLUK-TV in Green Bay were all affiliated with NBC prior to their switches), resulting in a three-way swap that resulted in WGNO becoming the market's new ABC affiliate, while the WB affiliation (along with cartoons and some syndicated programs that were part of WGNO's inventory) moved to former Fox affiliate WNOL-TV (channel 38). The first ABC program to air on WGNO was Good Morning America at 7:00 a.m. Central Time.

As a result of joining ABC, channel 26 became the second Tribune-owned station to switch to a "Big Three" network (Atlanta sister station WGNX, now owned by Gray Television as their flagship station WANF, was set to affiliate with The WB at its launch, but joined CBS one month prior in December 1994 after WAGA-TV switched from CBS to Fox through a deal with New World Communications) and only the third "Big Three" station in its portfolio (along with KDAL-TV (now KDLH) in Duluth, Minnesota, a CBS affiliate that Tribune had owned from 1960 to 1970). From 1999—when Tribune sold WGNX in Atlanta to the Meredith Corporation—until 2013, WGNO was the only Tribune-owned television station that was affiliated with a "Big Three" network (by 2007, the company's other 22 stations were, and remain, affiliates of either Fox, The CW or MyNetworkTV). However, Tribune's December 2013 acquisition of Local TV added eleven additional "Big Three" stations to its portfolio; the purchase also displaced WGNO/WNOL as the company's smallest television stations by market size, with the Fort Smith, Arkansas duopoly of CBS affiliate KFSM-TV and MyNetworkTV affiliate KXNW filling that role.

Tribune Broadcasting began managing the operations of WNOL under a local marketing agreement in 1996. The company merged with channel 38's then-owner Qwest Broadcasting (a company run by a group of minority investors led by Quincy Jones) in 2000, creating the market's first television duopoly with WGNO. Despite now being placed under common ownership, WGNO and WNOL continued to operate separately from one another: WNOL continued to be based out of its existing studio facility on Canal Street. In July 2005, WGNO relocated from its studio facilities at the World Trade Center New Orleans in the city's Central Business District to a facility at New Orleans Centre.

As Hurricane Katrina approached the Louisiana coast in August 2005, WGNO's operations were moved to fellow ABC affiliate WBRZ-TV in Baton Rouge. For a time after the hurricane hit, the station's evening newscasts were produced out of various locations throughout the New Orleans area as the main studio at the World Trade Center New Orleans was inaccessible. WGNO eventually established temporary facilities (including a makeshift studio and control room) from two trailers outside of the Louisiana Superdome, with most of the station's broadcast equipment being purchased from eBay resellers. In April 2006, WGNO announced that its broadcast operations would temporarily relocate back to the World Trade Center building as New Orleans Centre management decided not to re-open the complex and terminated the station's lease agreement (WGNO had only moved into the facility a few weeks before Katrina hit the area).

In February 2007, Tribune announced that rather than move WGNO to WNOL's facility on Canal Street, the station would instead move its operations to The Galleria building in nearby Metairie; this made WGNO the first New Orleans area television station to move its studio facilities outside of the city proper. Station management indicated that they wanted to keep WGNO's operations in New Orleans, but could not find a facility that was suitable. The station began broadcasting from new high definition-ready studios inside The Galleria on August 29, 2007 (coinciding with the second anniversary of Hurricane Katrina), which included a brand-new news set and weather center.

On April 1, 2012, Tribune Broadcasting removed all WGNO, WNOL, and its then 21 other television stations from satellite provider DirecTV due to a carriage dispute over an increase in payments to transmit the stations' signals. DirecTV signed a new carriage agreement with Tribune on April 4, 2012, restoring both stations as well as the other Tribune-owned stations on DirecTV.

Aborted sale to Sinclair; sale to Nexstar

Sinclair Broadcast Group entered into an agreement to acquire Tribune Media on May 8, 2017, for $3.9 billion, plus the assumption of $2.7 billion in Tribune debt. The deal received significant scrutiny over Sinclair's forthrightness in its applications to sell certain conflict properties, prompting the FCC to designate it for hearing and leading Tribune to terminate the deal and sue Sinclair for breach of contract.

Following the Sinclair deal's collapse, Nexstar Media Group of Irving, Texas, announced its purchase of Tribune Media on December 3, 2018, for $6.4 billion in cash and debt. The sale was completed on September 19, 2019.

Effects of Hurricane Ida
During Hurricane Ida on August 29, 2021, The Galleria studio's ceiling was ripped by high winds at the control room forcing all staff, producers, and anchors to evacuate the studio, just minutes prior to a power outage being reported inside the studio.

Programming
Syndicated programs broadcast on WGNO include Extra, The Big Bang Theory, The Wendy Williams Show, The Drew Barrymore Show, Access Hollywood, The People’s Court, and Judge Mathis. The station also produces NOLA Marketplace, a program profiling New Orleans area businesses.

In 1993, legendary network executive Brandon Tartikoff, who had engineered a successful turnaround of NBC's programming and viewership during the 1980s as president of the network, created a game show for WGNO called NO It Alls (hosted by present-day sports director Ed Daniels and hostess Isis Casanova); the program entered into national syndication in 1996, under the modified title Know It Alls. NO It Alls ended in March 1996 with the start of the station's news programming.

Sports programming
From 1993 (when the team relocated to New Orleans from Denver) until 1995, WGNO served as the over-the-air broadcaster of the American Association's New Orleans Zephyrs (now a member of the Pacific Coast League), carrying games from the minor league baseball franchise.

For a few years, WGNO had no NFL games outside of one simulcast wild card game from ESPN per year due to its ABC affiliation, and WDSU carrying the Monday Night Football games of the New Orleans Saints that were carried by ABC until the 2006 move of that package to ESPN. Until 2015, it carried Saints games that were produced as part of the NFL Network's Thursday Night Football package before that moved to a split between NBC and CBS. Thus, the only way the station would carry a Saints game is if they were a wild card or low division winner, and ESPN was chosen to broadcast that Wild Card Weekend game with ABC. This changed with the 2018 NFL season, when CBS' portion of the Thursday night schedule was moved to Fox and NBC's portion, except for the annual NFL Kickoff and Thanksgiving night games, became exclusive to NFL Network. Until 2021, WGNO carried any Saints Thursday night games which are otherwise exclusive to NFL Network.

WGNO also airs select New Orleans Pelicans games through the network's broadcast rights with the NBA.

News operation
WGNO presently broadcasts 22 hours of locally produced newscasts each week (with four hours on weekdays, and one hour each on Saturdays and Sundays); in regards to the number of hours devoted to news programming, it is the lowest newscast output out of the New Orleans market's television stations. Unlike most ABC affiliates in large or mid-sized markets, WGNO does not carry a morning newscast on weekends; until 2020, it also did not carry traditional local newscasts in the 5:00, 6:00, and 10:00 p.m. timeslots on weekdays or on Saturday evenings, opting to air the magazine-style news program News with a Twist in those slots. In addition, the station produced the half-hour public affairs program The 411, which airs Sundays at 6:30 a.m. with a rebroadcast later that morning on WNOL-TV.

During hurricane coverage, WGNO often partners with other Nexstar-owned stations to supplement WGNO's storm coverage; audio of the station's hurricane coverage is also simulcast on WTIX-FM (94.3), as was the case during Hurricane Gustav in September 2008 (in which WGNO hurricane coverage resulted in the station canceling local segments of the Jerry Lewis MDA Telethon, which aired as scheduled on WNOL-TV) and Hurricane Isaac in August 2012. Since it launched its news operation in 1996, WGNO's newscasts have typically placed last among the market's four news-producing stations, similar to that of other former independents and Fox stations that joined a Big Three network as a result of the affiliation switches that occurred between 1994 and 1996.

Prior to affiliating with ABC, news programming on WGNO consisted solely of news updates that ran daily from 1971 to the mid-1980s, airing during the station's syndicated programming. The station also produced a sports discussion program called the Hometown Sports Page during its latter years as an independent in the early 1990s. WGNO began developing a full-scale news department shortly after taking the ABC affiliation; the news department launched on March 18, 1996, with the debut of half-hour newscasts at 5:00 p.m. each weeknight and seven nights a week at 10:00 p.m. The station added an additional half-hour early evening newscast at 6:00 p.m. on September 21, 1998 (prior to that point, the station continued to air syndicated programming during the 6:00 p.m. half-hour). During the mid-to-late 2000s, the station was known for its "Wheel of Justice" series, which featured a bounty hunter named Tat-2, capturing local criminals with arrest warrants.

On May 1, 2006, WGNO began producing a half-hour prime time newscast at 9:00 p.m. weeknights for WNOL, designed as a competitor to the longer established hour-long newscast on Fox affiliate WVUE that had been airing in that same timeslot since the 1996 switch; the program ended on June 4, 2010, due to declining ratings (three days later on June 7, WNOL moved The CW's prime time schedule from the recommended 7:00 to 9:00 p.m. slot for the network's Central Time Zone affiliates, to 8:00 to 10:00 p.m. on tape delay). For many years after joining ABC, WGNO had the distinction of being one of the largest major network affiliates by market size that did not produce a weekday morning or midday newscast; this changed on September 8, 2008, when the station debuted a half-hour newscast at 11:00 a.m.; this was followed on September 29 by the launch of a two-hour morning newscast, Good Morning New Orleans, running from 5:00 to 7:00 a.m. On April 20, 2009, WGNO moved its 6:00 p.m. newscast to the 6:30 timeslot, in order to reach viewers whose work commutes prevented them from arriving home in time to watch a 6:00 p.m. newscast; syndicated programming filled the program's former timeslot. The program did not attract significant viewership, and fell to last place in the evening news ratings within a year of its launch; the following year, the station reinstated its 6:00 p.m. newscast, creating the New Orleans market's only hour-long news block during that hour.

On January 31, 2011, WGNO reformatted the 6:00 p.m. newscast as News with a Twist, a newsmagazine format that focuses on lighter stories and commentary and utilizes a mostly unscripted format. On December 12, 2011, the News with a Twist format was extended to the 5:00 p.m. newscast, concurrent with cancellation of the 6:30 p.m. newscast; the station's Saturday evening newscasts were replaced on December 17 with a weekend edition of News with a Twist that recaps feature stories seen during that week's 5:00 and 6:00 p.m. broadcasts. The weekday morning, 11:00 a.m. and Sunday evening newscasts retain a more traditional news format. WGNO – as well as WDSU – continue to broadcast their local newscasts in widescreen standard definition (WVUE was the first New Orleans area station to broadcasts its newscasts in high definition with WWL-TV upgrading to HD in October 2014); channel 26 is also the only news-producing television station owned by Tribune Broadcasting that does not broadcast its news programming in true high definition.

At the start of April 2020, the News with a Twist format was entirely discontinued as the state became a major hotspot in the coronavirus pandemic and Nexstar felt a return to a traditional newscast format in evening hours was much more appropriate. A section under the title remains on the station's website (likely to retain the concept's copyright), but outside local food features, has not been updated since that time.

Notable current on-air staff
 Susan Roesgen – anchor

Notable former on-air staff
 Mike Church – commentator; seen Tuesdays and Thursdays on News with a Twist
 Brad Giffen – anchor/reporter (1996–2002; currently at CFTO in Toronto and CTV News Channel)
 Kinsey Schofield – anchor/reporter (2018–2019)
 Ronnie Virgets – correspondent for "Real New Orleans" (1990–1995)

Technical information

Subchannels
The station's digital signal is multiplexed:

Analog-to-digital conversion
When Hurricane Katrina made landfall on the Louisiana coast on August 29, 2005, the storm destroyed WGNO's analog and digital transmitters. WGNO and WNOL temporarily transmitted their analog signals from a multi-purpose tower in Algiers, and broadcast their digital signals as subchannels of i: Independent Television (now Ion Television) owned-and-operated station WPXL-TV until March 29, 2008, when WNOL's digital transmitter on UHF channel 15 began operations. On March 1, 2008, WGNO completed construction of its replacement digital transmitter; however, since it operated on the same frequency as its analog signal (on UHF channel 26), the digital transmitter could not become operational until WGNO's analog transmitter was shut down. Until then, WGNO's high definition digital feed was remapped to virtual channel 26.1 through WNOL's digital signal on UHF channel 15, with WNOL's programming broadcasting in standard definition on virtual channel 38.1. On June 12, 2009, WGNO flash-cut its digital signal into operation on UHF channel 26, allowing WNOL to resume high definition broadcasts on digital channel 15.

References

External links

 
 WGNO.AntennaTV.tv - WGNO-DT2 ("Antenna TV New Orleans") official website

Television stations in New Orleans
ABC network affiliates
Antenna TV affiliates
Rewind TV affiliates
TBD (TV network) affiliates
Nexstar Media Group
Television channels and stations established in 1967
1967 establishments in Louisiana